"Easy Love" is the debut single from British musician Sigala. It features an interpolation of the Jackson 5 song "ABC", re-produced by Hal Ritson and performed by Vula Malinga and Kyle Johnson. It was released on 4 September 2015 as a digital download in the United Kingdom through Ministry of Sound. The song debuted at number 71 on the UK Singles Chart based on streams alone and the following week, shot up 70 places up to peak at the top of both the UK Singles Chart and the UK Dance Chart. It also topped the UK Indie Chart.

Music video
A music video to accompany the release of "Easy Love" was first released onto YouTube on 4 August 2015 at a total length of two minutes and fifty-seven seconds. The full song has a total length of three minutes and fifty seconds. Shot in Los Angeles, the video features the Canadian-Filipino dancing duo Lucky Aces, whose appearance on The Ellen DeGeneres Show caught the attention of the video's producer, who cast the act in the video.

Denise Pearson appeared as a guest vocalist on a performance of "Easy Love" for the New Year's Day edition of Top of the Pops in 2016.

Track listing

Charts and certifications

Weekly charts

Certifications

Year-end charts

Release history

References

2015 singles
2014 songs
Sigala songs
Ministry of Sound singles
Number-one singles in Scotland
UK Singles Chart number-one singles
Songs written by Deke Richards
Songs written by Freddie Perren
Songs written by Alphonzo Mizell
Songs written by Berry Gordy
Tropical house songs